Alan Robinson is a Unionist politician from Northern Ireland representing the Democratic Unionist Party (DUP).

He was elected to Causeway Coast and Glens Borough Council in 2019.

Robinson has been a Member of the Northern Ireland Assembly (MLA) for East Londonderry since the May 2022 election.

References 

Living people
Democratic Unionist Party MLAs
21st-century British politicians
Northern Ireland MLAs 2022–2027
Politicians from County Londonderry
Year of birth missing (living people)